Mostafa Saad Abdallah Sayed (born 22 August 2001) is an Egyptian professional footballer who plays as a winger for Smouha, on loan from Al Ahly.

Club career
In September 2022, Saad signed for Al Ahly on a five-year deal. He suffered an injury shortly after joining Al Ahly, keeping him out for three weeks and disrupting his integration into the first team. Despite this injury, manager Marcel Koller promised Saad in November 2022 that he would receive more game time.

In January 2023, Saad asked to leave Al Ahly on loan, due to a lack of playing time, with a number of Egyptian Premier League sides interested, including former club Ceramica Cleopatra. He was eventually loaned to Smouha, thanking manager Ahmed Samy for giving him his debut against ENPPI, despite not yet having trained with the squad.

International career
Saad has represented Egypt at under-23 level.

Style of play
Saad is nicknamed Messi after Argentine playmaker Lionel Messi, due to the two sharing a similar stature and style of play.

Career statistics

Club

Notes

References

2001 births
Living people
Egyptian footballers
Egypt youth international footballers
Association football wingers
Egyptian Premier League players
Ceramica Cleopatra FC players
Zamalek SC players
Al Ahly SC players
Smouha SC players